Mishal Husain (born 11 February 1973) is a British newsreader and journalist for BBC Television and BBC Radio. She is the main Sunday presenter of the BBC News at Ten and BBC Weekend News and one of the main presenters of BBC Radio 4's Today. She has hosted The Andrew Marr Show, HARDtalk, Impact and BBC Breakfast. Husain is also a relief presenter of the BBC News at Six, BBC World News and BBC News Channel.

Early life
Mishal Husain was born on 11 February 1973 in Northampton, England to Pakistani parents. Her mother was a teacher and former producer for Pakistan Television Corporation, while her father was a urologist.

She is the granddaughter of Syed Shahid Hamid, the first Director-General of Pakistan's Inter-Services Intelligence.

Husain attended the British School in Abu Dhabi; the family were also based in Saudi Arabia for a period. Husain returned to England at the age of 12 to continue her education at Cobham Hall School, an independent school in Kent. She read law at New Hall, Cambridge (now Murray Edwards College, Cambridge) followed by a master's degree in International and Comparative Law at the European University Institute in Florence, Italy.

Journalism career
Husain gained her first experience of journalism at the age of 18, spending three months as a city reporter in Islamabad, Pakistan, at the English-language newspaper The News. Then, while at university, she did several stints at the BBC as work experience.

Her first job was at Bloomberg Television in London from 1996, where she was a producer and sometime presenter. Two years later, in 1998, she joined the BBC as a junior producer in the newsroom and for the News 24 channel, and then in the Economics and Business Unit. Within a few months she moved in front of the camera and has since worked in a variety of roles: on the daily Breakfast programme, on Asia Business Report (based in Singapore), and as a presenter of business news on both BBC World News and the BBC News Channel. From September 2002 she was the corporation's Washington correspondent, serving as the main news anchor through the buildup to the invasion of Iraq and during the war. She has interviewed many high-profile figures including Paul Wolfowitz, Richard Armitage, Richard Perle, Paul Kagame and Emmerson Mnangagwa.

On 8 May 2010, she published an autobiographical essay in The Independent based on a nostalgia trip to the UAE. In 2011, Husain hosted Impact on BBC World News, but in spring and summer 2011 she was engaged on making a documentary on the Arab Spring, for airing in the autumn of 2011. She presents the Sunday evening editions of the BBC Weekend News on BBC One. On 2 December 2011, it was announced that Husain would be part of the BBC's Olympic Presenting team.

On 17 March 2013 she presented the last News at Ten to be broadcast from BBC Television Centre. On 16 July 2013, the BBC's Director-General Lord Hall announced that Husain was to become a presenter of BBC Radio 4's Today programme in the autumn. She continues to be the main presenter of the Sunday evening editions of the BBC News at Ten on BBC One and on occasions on BBC World News and the BBC News Channel. Husain presented her first edition of Today on 7 October 2013, when her co-presenter was John Humphrys. On 7 November 2013, it was announced that Husain would be part of the BBCs Commonwealth Games Presenting team. Husain is also a relief presenter of the BBC News at Six and the main Sunday presenter of the BBC News at Ten. She has occasionally presented Newsnight on BBC Two.

Husain won the Broadcaster of the Year Award at the London Press Club Awards in 2015.

In 2013, Husain interviewed the Burmese Leader Aung San Suu Kyi. During the intense cross examination, "Kyi lost her cool following a tense interview". It was claimed Suu Kyi was heard muttering "no one told me I was going to be interviewed by a Muslim".

On 27 November 2017, she recorded an interview with Prince Harry and Meghan Markle.

Other work and awards
When the first series of Star Spell – a spin-off from Hard Spell that had only appeared before as a one-off episode – aired, Husain appeared as word pronouncer, replacing Nina Hossain. She continued in this role throughout the second series of Hard Spell. Husain appeared in a round of the BBC's Celebrity Mastermind in 2010, coming third out of four. Her specialised subject was the Narnia books of C. S. Lewis.

She is also one of the judges for the Amnesty International Media Awards. She featured on a show entitled Gandhi that was broadcast by the BBC in March 2012. She also featured as the morning anchor presenter on BBC One during the 2012 Summer Olympics in London and the 2014 Commonwealth Games in Glasgow.

Husain is an ambassador for the charity Mosaic, which helps young people from deprived communities to realise their talents and potential.

In January 2014, Husain was awarded the Services to Media award at the British Muslim Awards.

Husain has written a book, The Skills, a guide for women on how to achieve their career goals. It was published in 2018, and was described as "the ultimate handbook for women."

Personal life
Husain married Meekal Hashmi in July 2003. The couple have three boys, Rafael, and twins Musa and Zaki and live in Camden, North London.

Amid widespread condemnation of the killing of ISIL hostages in 2014, Husain voiced support for the use of social media to denounce its extremism.  In an interview with the Radio Times, she urged Muslim scholars to use social media to condemn its attempt to use horrific videos to draw support in the West, from the leading British Islamic organisations.

Husain, who is the first Muslim presenter of BBC Radio 4's Today programme, said, "I think the Not in My Name campaign is a very positive development because outrage is shared by all right-thinking people. I would really like to see much more of the counterpoint from a theological perspective, with scholars taking to social media to refute the awful arguments we see put forward in those videos."

References

External links
 

Living people
Alumni of New Hall, Cambridge
BBC newsreaders and journalists
BBC World News
English expatriates in the United Arab Emirates
English journalists
English Muslims
English people of Pakistani descent
People educated at Cobham Hall School
European University Institute alumni
WFTV Award winners
British women television journalists
British women radio presenters
People from Northampton
1973 births